You Know So Well is the debut EP of Norwegian artist Sondre Lerche. The EP was only released in Norway.

Lerche released his debut EP You Know So Well in February 2001. His debut single "You Know So Well" was released to the media in Norway in December 2000. In early 2001, the single entered #3 on the National Airplay Chart in Norway, and #2 on the sales chart.

Track listing

Charts

References

External links
You Know So Well EP at SondreLerche.com

2001 debut EPs